The Place You Can't Remember, the Place You Can't Forget is the seventh studio album by British electronic music artist Chicane. The album was officially announced on 4 May 2018, along with the release of the second single from the album "Serendipity". It was released on 8 June 2018 by Modena Records and Armada Music.

Track listing

Charts

References 

2018 albums
Armada Music albums
Chicane (musician) albums